The Kabenna is a river of central Ethiopia. It is a tributary of the Awash River to its west, having its source to the southwest of Ankobar. G.W.B. Huntingford speculates that it may be the same river as the Kuba, which is mentioned in the Futuh al-habaša ("The Conquest of Abyssinia"), the narrative of Imam Ahmad Gragn's conquest of the Ethiopian Empire.

See also 
 List of rivers of Ethiopia

References 

Awash River
Rivers of Ethiopia